Let Me In: Original Motion Picture Soundtrack is a soundtrack album and film score for the film of the same name. It was released by Varèse Sarabande on October 12, 2010 and was recorded at Northwest Sinfonia in Seattle, Washington State. The soundtrack was composed by Academy Award winner Michael Giacchino.

Track listing

Songs featured in the film, but not on the soundtrack
In addition to the musical score, several songs from the 1980s can be heard through the film.
 The Greg Kihn Band - "The Breakup Song (They Don't Write 'Em)"
 Blue Öyster Cult - "Burnin' for You"
 Culture Club - "Do You Really Want to Hurt Me"
 Culture Club - "Time (Clock of the Heart)"
 Freur - "Doot-Doot"
 The Vapors - "Turning Japanese"
 David Bowie - "Let's Dance"
And the classic now and later advertisement song which also is heard a few times through the movie.

References

External links
 Soundtracks for Let Me In at Internet Movie Database

2010 soundtrack albums
Horror film soundtracks
Michael Giacchino soundtracks
Varèse Sarabande soundtracks